Arto Harald Nilsson (19 March 1948, Helsinki – 11 July 2019) was a boxer from  Finland.

He competed for Finland in the 1968 Summer Olympics held in Mexico City, Mexico in the light welterweight event where he finished in third place.

1968 Olympic results
Below is the record of Arto Nilsson, a Finnish light welterweight boxer who competed at the 1968 Mexico City Olympics:

 Round of 64: bye
 Round of 32: defeated John Olulu (Kenya) by decision, 5-0
 Round of 16: defeated Gert Puzicha (West Germany) by decision, 3-2
 Quarterfinal: defeated Petar Stoitchev (Bulgaria) referee stopped contest
 Semifinal: lost to Jerzy Kulej (Poland) by decision, 0-5 (was awarded bronze medal)

References

Sports-reference

1948 births
2019 deaths
Light-welterweight boxers
Sportspeople from Helsinki
Olympic boxers of Finland
Olympic bronze medalists for Finland
Boxers at the 1968 Summer Olympics
Olympic medalists in boxing
Finnish male boxers
Medalists at the 1968 Summer Olympics